This is a list of NGC objects 7001–7840 from the New General Catalogue (NGC). The astronomical catalogue is composed mainly of star clusters, nebulae, and galaxies. Other objects in the catalogue can be found in the other subpages of the list of NGC objects.

The constellation information in these tables is taken from The Complete New General Catalogue and Index Catalogue of Nebulae and Star Clusters by J. L. E. Dreyer, which was accessed using the "VizieR Service". Galaxy types are identified using the NASA/IPAC Extragalactic Database. The other data of these tables are from the SIMBAD Astronomical Database unless otherwise stated.

7001–7100

7101–7200

7201–7300

7301–7400

7401–7500

7501–7600

7601–7700

7701–7800

7801–7840

See also
 Lists of astronomical objects

Notes

References

 8
NGC objects 7001-7840